Bloodletting is a formerly common medical procedure now generally abandoned.

Bloodletting may also refer to :
Bloodletting in Mesoamerica, ritualized self-cutting or piercing of an individual's body that served a number of ideological and cultural functions within ancient Mesoamerican societies
Bloodletting (Concrete Blonde album), album by Concrete Blonde 
Bloodletting (Overkill album), album by Overkill
Bloodletting (Boxer album), an album by the rock band Boxer in 1976
"Bloodletting" (The Walking Dead), an episode of the television series The Walking Dead
Bloodletting Press, small publishing house focused on horror fiction
Bloodletting & Miraculous Cures, short story collection by Vincent Lam
Bait and bleed, military strategy
Dhabihah, method to slaughter animals according to Islamic law by bloodletting
Exsanguination, blood loss, to a degree sufficient to cause death in either animals or humans
Kashrut, (kosher) method to slaughter animals according to Judaic law by bloodletting